David Harrower (born 1966) is a Scottish playwright who (as of 2005) lives in Glasgow. Harrower has published over 10 original works, as well as numerous translations and adaptations.

Career
Harrower's first play, Knives in Hens, which premiered at Edinburgh's Traverse Theatre in 1995, was considered a critical and popular success. It deals with a relationship triangle in a rural setting, and a woman's internal quest to find out what she wants from life.

Subsequent plays include Kill the Old Torture Their Young (Traverse, 1998), which follows a disparate group of characters across an unnamed city, mixing realism with poetry and fantasy. Presence (Royal Court Theatre Upstairs, April 2001) takes another look at the Beatles' residency at the Indra club in Hamburg on the eve of their success, and Dark Earth (Traverse, August 2003) begins as a broad comedy and turns into a speculation about the meaning of history and the land.

Harrower has also written adaptations including: The Chrysalids (1999), adapted from John Wyndham's novel, for the National Theatre's Connections project; Six Characters Looking for an Author, a version of Pirandello's Six Characters in Search of an Author, first staged at the Young Vic in 2000; Chekhov's Ivanov (2002), performed at the National Theatre; and Buchner's Woyzeck, performed at the Edinburgh Lyceum in 2002.

He has also translated The Girl on the Sofa (2002), by Jon Fosse, presented in a joint production by the Edinburgh International Festival and the Schaubuhne, Berlin, and Schiller's Mary Stuart for the National Theatre of Scotland/Royal Lyceum, Edinburgh/Citizens' Theatre, Glasgow.

In 2005, his play Blackbird was produced by the Edinburgh International Festival, directed by Peter Stein and transferred in February 2006 to the Albery Theatre in London's West End It depicts the meeting between a young woman and a middle-aged man who, fifteen years earlier when she was twelve years old, kidnapped and raped her. In April 2008 the play was revived by David Grindley at the Rose Theatre, Kingston prior to a national tour . In 2011, this play was produced by Rogue Machine in Los Angeles. This production won the LA Drama Critics Circle Award for Best Writing and Lead Performance by Sam Anderson.

His play 365 was presented by the National Theatre of Scotland at the Edinburgh International Festival in 2008, directed by Vicky Featherstone. The play recounts the stories of 14 young people who have been in care are now living on their own in 'practice flats'. It was subsequently performed in London at the Lyric Theatre, Hammersmith.

In 2011, he wrote a new version of Gogol's classic text, The Government Inspector, produced at London's Young Vic Theatre, directed by Richard Jones and starring The Mighty Boosh's Julian Barratt and Smack the Pony's Doon Mackichan and Kyle Soller.

Plays

Original plays
 Knives in Hens
 Kill the Old Torture Their Young
 Presence
 Dark Earth
 Blackbird
 365
 Lucky Box
 A Slow Air
 Ciara
 54% Acrylic

Adaptations and translations
 Six Characters in Search of an Author
 The Chrysalids
 Tales from the Vienna Woods
 Ivanov
 Woyzeck
 The Girl on the Sofa
 Mary Stuart
 The Good Soul of Szechuan for Young Vic
 Sweet Nothings (after Arthur Schnitzler's Liebelei) for the Young Vic
 The Government Inspector for Young Vic
 Calum's Road for the National Theatre of Scotland

Bibliography
Knives in Hens Methuen, 1997
Kill the Old Torture their Young Methuen, 1998
Presence Faber and Faber, 2001
Six Characters Looking for an Author (Luigi Pirandello) in a new version for the Young Vic Methuen, 2001
The Chrysalids (adaptation) Faber and Faber, 2001
Ivanov (Anton Chekhov) in a new version for the Royal National Theatre Oberon, 2002
Purple (Jon Fosse) Faber and Faber/NT Connections, 2002
The Girl on the Sofa (Jon Fosse) Oberon, 2002
Dark Earth Faber and Faber, 2003
Tales from the Vienna Woods (Ödön von Horváth) in a new version for the RNT Faber and Faber, 2003

References

Sources
Theatre Record and its annual Indexes
 Aleks Sierz: In-Yer-Face Theatre. British Drama Today. 2001

External links 
 British Council profile
 Guardian interview 2002
 British Theatre Guide interview, August 2005; Philip Fisher, interviewer
 Harrower at agent Casarotto Ramsay 
 Harrower CV
 David Harrower at Doollee 
 
 
 

Scottish dramatists and playwrights
1966 births
Living people
Writers from Edinburgh